The Sleepwalker is a lost 1922 American drama silent film directed by Edward LeSaint and written by Wells Hastings and Aubrey Stauffer. Starring Constance Binney, Jack Mulhall, Edythe Chapman, Florence Roberts, Bertram Grassby, Cleo Ridgely and Winifred Edwards, it was released on April 9, 1922, by Paramount Pictures.

Plot
As described in a film magazine, Doris Dumond (Binney) leaves the convent and joins her mother Mrs. Fabian Dumond (Roberts), who is being harassed by the villainous debt collector Ambrose Hammond (Grassby), at a fashionable hotel. A young millionaire, Phillip Carruthers (Mulhall), who loves her and whom she loves is also present. When Doris learns of her mother's difficulty she is moved by her subconscious mind to walk into the villain's room in her sleep. She awakens in Ambrose's hotel room, and discovery follows. Towards the next morning, Doris again walks in her sleep and, from a lofty window ledge, she rescues Mary (Edwards), the young daughter of another guest (Ridgely) who had seen Doris go into Ambrose's room and sought to disgrace her. In the end, all prior difficulties are disposed of.

Cast
Constance Binney as Doris Dumond
Jack Mulhall as Phillip Carruthers
Edythe Chapman as Sister Ursula
Florence Roberts as Mrs. Fabian Dumond
Bertram Grassby as Ambrose Hammond
Cleo Ridgely as Mrs. Langley
Winifred Edwards as Mary Langley

References

External links

1922 films
1920s English-language films
Silent American drama films
1922 drama films
Paramount Pictures films
Films directed by Edward LeSaint
American black-and-white films
American silent feature films
Lost American films
1922 lost films
Lost drama films
1920s American films